Dick Tiger (born Richard Ihetu; August 14, 1929 – December 14, 1971) was a Nigerian-born professional boxer who held the undisputed middleweight and light-heavyweight championships. 

Tiger emigrated to Liverpool, England to pursue his boxing career and later to the United States. Tiger was Igbo and served as a Lieutenant in the Biafran army during the Nigerian Civil War, primarily training soldiers in hand to hand combat.

Tiger was inducted into the International Boxing Hall of Fame in 1991. The Ring magazine named him Fighter of the Year in 1962 and 1965, while the Boxing Writers Association of America (BWAA) named him Fighter of the Year in 1962 and 1966. In 1996, Tiger was voted as one of the best boxers of the 1960s, The later in 1998, Tiger was put in the book of "Best boxers of the 20th Century". In 2002, Tiger was voted by The Ring magazine as the 31st greatest fighter of the last 80 years.

Professional career
Tiger became a two-time undisputed world middleweight champion and helped keep boxing alive during the 1950s boxing industry recession. Tiger won the WBA middleweight title when he beat Gene Fullmer on October 23 1962 and the light heavyweight title in 1966 when he dethroned José Torres of Puerto Rico.

Prior to these accomplishments, however, Tiger seemed condemned to poor management and a resulting lack of exposure. In 1957, using Liverpool as his fighting base, Tiger was fighting on undercards for small purses, when by fortune, facing off against popular favorite Terry Downes at Shoreditch Town Hall, he walked away with a TKO after six heats.  New management saw to it certain "errors in his style" were corrected, and in another year, Tiger had taken 17 of 19 fights and won the British Middleweight title. In 1959, handled by the independent Jersey Jones, Tiger came to America, to face adversity in a whole, new way. Jersey Jones, resisting the influences of Madison Square Garden, brokered deals for Tiger by himself, which in the short run, cost them both. In an independent promotion at Edmonton, Alberta, Tiger's Empire belt was lost in a more-than questionable 15 round nod to local challenger Wilf Greaves. The decision as rendered, had first been called a draw; appalled, Jones demanded a recount of the cards, which boomeranged, showing the fight, dominated by Tiger, as a win for Greaves. Tiger, sincere and honorable in his dealings, often found this virtuous approach not reciprocated, particularly in North America.

A. J. Liebling, impressed in witnessing Tiger's 1962 performance versus Henry Hank of Detroit, described the fighter's appearance thus, "... a chest like an old-fashioned black office safe, dropping away to a slender waist, big thighs, and slender legs; he boxed classically, his arms tight against his sides at the beginning of a punch, his savagely methodical blows moving in short arcs and straight lines."

Such a description was similarly evoked, albeit in simpler terms, by Tiger's contemporaries.
Gene Fullmer: "Tiger was a rough guy....I went to Nigeria to fight him, and, of course, I don't know what happened over there....He beat me. He beat me bad. My mother and father could have been judge and referee, and I couldn't have won a round..."
Joey Giardello: "I thank Dick Tiger because Dick Tiger was a man and Dick Tiger gave (a title shot) to me. He didn't have to give it to me. He could have give it to somebody else."
An additional comment from Giardello, in the form of a sarcastic bon mot, showed contemporary respect for Tiger as a fellow battler. The pair fought four times in all, the last two of these in swapping the middleweight title. Every fight went the distance, meaning that in terms of time, Dick Tiger and Joey Giardello contended face to face for two and a half hours. Prior to one of these latter encounters, when asked by the press if Giardello, a classic boxer, planned to trade punches with Tiger, Giardello squelched this with, "I wouldn't trade stamps with him."

Numerous accounts of Tiger as both man and fighting man, describe a solid, decent, un-nuanced person. Unsurprisingly, a very Western gimmick, the literal "power of the press", or perhaps of Madison Avenue, appears lost on him. Contender Joey Archer, a scientific middleweight of uncommon speed, launched a small space ad campaign directed at Tiger. The ads, using copy such as "I'm a middleweight, and I've licked every man I ever fought, including you", were employed to create a sensation and perhaps a groundswell toward securing Archer a title fight. Tiger had already signed to fight Emile Griffith, and an Archer ad admonished, "The Middleweight Champion should meet the best middleweight (not a welterweight)." Archer carried his cause to talk shows, even to the New York Daily News, was photographed taunting an angry, caged tiger at the Bronx Zoo. Whether this bombast registered in any negative way, or even impacted Dick Tiger's pride, history never discovered after Emile Griffith won Tiger's middleweight belt from him, making Tiger a non-player in the drama. Joey Archer shifted his attentions and, from 1966, Tiger campaigned as a full light heavyweight.

After decisioning Jose Torres to win title honors, Tiger then defended his crown against Torres and Montanan Roger Rouse, before coming up short against Bob Foster of Albuquerque, New Mexico, sometimes described as a veteran, although he was only 26 with 33 fights. Tiger was the veteran, at nearly 40 and his 4th last fight.. The left hook Foster used to dethrone Tiger in an instant, was rated among "The 10 Deadliest Punches of the Last 25 Years" in 1975.  The power in the one-punch K.O. made such an impact upon Garden promoters, it was felt that a rematch would do poor business. This attitude forced Tiger to contend for the right to regain his crown, and saw him matched against up-and-comer Frankie DePaula, who was coming off five consecutive knockouts. The fight to qualify against Foster was, for its first four rounds, a war which saw both men go down twice, and was selected by Ring magazine as "Fight of the Year". Though Dick Tiger took the decision, having proved his mettle, ill treatment on the American side seemed to cling, as Frankie DePaula, the man he had defeated, was inexplicably given the chance at Bob Foster.

Retirement and death
Tiger travelled from his home of Nigeria to Liverpool, Western England and eventually the United States in the latter parts of his career, making a big contribution to boxing.

After retiring from boxing, Tiger worked as a guard at the Metropolitan Museum of Art in New York. One day, he felt a strong pain in his back. Tested by doctors, he was diagnosed with liver cancer. 

He had been banned by the Nigerian government in his country because of his involvement in the Biafran movement; however, the ban was lifted immediately after news about his condition arrived in Nigeria. He died of liver cancer on 14 December 1971 in Aba, Nigeria, at the age of 42.

Professional boxing record

Portrayals

Fiction
A fictional August 29, 1963 Madison Square Garden bout in which a heavily favored Dick Tiger loses to Tom "The Hammer" Case of Dallas, Texas comes near the end of Stephen King's time-travel novel, 11/22/63.

Television
Appeared as a guest on an episode of the American television series What's My Line? (June 16, 1963). The panel correctly guessed his occupation.

See also
List of middleweight boxing champions
List of light-heavyweight boxing champions

References

Further reading

External links

 Emeagwali, Philip, "DICK TIGER: Photo Essay"

|-

 

 

1929 births
1971 deaths
Middleweight boxers
Light-heavyweight boxers
World middleweight boxing champions
World light-heavyweight boxing champions
World Boxing Association champions
World Boxing Council champions
The Ring (magazine) champions
International Boxing Hall of Fame inductees
Deaths from liver cancer
Sportspeople from Imo State
Igbo sportspeople
Nigerian male boxers